is Japanese actor and singer associated with Burning Productions. After appearing in the television drama Tentai Kansoku in 2002, Koike began appearing in several other films and dramas, notably as Atsushi Otani in Love Com. At the same time, Koike was also in the music duo WaT with Eiji Wentz from 2002 to 2016.

Career

2002
 Moved to Tokyo in the spring. Changed schools to Horikoshi High (also attended at the same time as NEWS' Tomohisa Yamashita & Yuya Tegoshi, D-BOYS' Yu Shirota, Japanese actor and singer Toma Ikuta and KAT-TUN's Koki Tanaka)
 Met Eiji Wentz while working and formed WaT. Started doing street lives.
 Debuted as an actor in the drama Tentai Kansoku.

2004
 WaT released debut indies C.D. Sotsugyō Time in June.

2005
 Acted in the drama Gokusen 2 (January 15 – March 19), which was part of the reason for his increasing popularity.
 Appeared as Hideki Ogata, a major, regular character in the TBS television drama "Dragon Zakura" (July – September 2005), alongside his high school fellow Tomohisa Yamashita.
 WaT signs with Universal Music in August, releases first major single Boku no Kimochi in November, reaching second place on the Oricon chart. They are the band with the shortest time gap between debut and appearing on NHK's Kōhaku Uta Gassen.
 Released his first photobook, First Letter From Teppei.

2006
 Presented with the Newcomer's forty-third Golden Arrow Award (WaT).
 Presented with the twentieth Gold Disc Award for "Best New Artist".
 First leading role in the movie Lovely Complex as Atsushi Otani.
 Official supporter in 2006's International Volleyball Tournament (WaT).
 Nominated for the Best Supporting Actor in the forty-ninth Drama Academy Award, for his performance in Iryu.
 Released his second photobook, Kiss me, Kiss me.
 On New Year's Eve, WaT performed for the second time in N.H.K.'s Kōhaku.
 Acted in the drama Iryu, as Ijyuuin.

2007
 First music solo project was announced on January tenth.
 His story of leaving his family and hometown to pursue his dream to be a performer was turned into a fifty-two pages one shot manga entitled Bokura no Ibasho by Nakahara Aya, the author of the manga Lovely Complex.
 Solo single, Kimi ni Okuru Uta, was released on February fourteen, Valentine's Day, with Wentz's solo song Lucky de Happy as the B-side song.
 Solo album, Pieces was released on June 27.

2015
 Performed as "L" in the Death Note musical in Tokyo, Osaka and Nagoya, Japan, premiere April 6, 2015.

Filmography

Film

Television

Variety TV shows 
 Ame ni mo makezu! (Fuji Terebi) – host along with his partner, Wentz.

Solo discography

Singles

Albums
 2007-06-27: pieces, which contains 12 self-penned songs
 2009-07-15: Jack in the Box . Debut position & 1st week sales – No. 15 ; 10,580

Awards

Japan Academy Prize

|-
| 2009 || The Homeless Student || Newcomer of the Year || 
|-

References

External links 
 Teppei Official site 
 WaT Official site 

Japanese male actors
Japanese male pop singers
People from Ōsakasayama, Osaka
1986 births
Living people
Musicians from Osaka Prefecture
21st-century Japanese singers
21st-century Japanese male singers